Suka K. Frederiksen (18 July 1965 – 21 July 2020) was a Greenlandic politician. 
Frederiksen was a member of the Inatsisartut (2014 to 2018) and had held the position of Minister of Independence and Agriculture (2016 to 2018) and Foreign Affairs (2017 to 2018).

Early life and education
Frederiksen was born on 18 July 1965 in Narsaq, Greenland. From 2007 to 2010, she completed a management diploma and a bachelor of commerce.

Career
In 1986, Frederiksen started her career as an office clerk and worked for HK Commercial. She spent the next five years at a sheep farm before working briefly at a grocery store in Greenland. In 1994, Frederiksen started a ten-year position as a principal for Narsaq before moving on and held managerial positions in Kujalleq Municipality.

Frederiksen started her career in politics as a city councilor for Narsaq Municipality in 2005. After her position ended in 2009, her next political position came in 2014 when she was elected to the Inatsisartut. During her time at the Inatsisartut, she became the first Minister of Independence for Greenland in 2016. As Minister of Independence, Frederiksen led a committee that began drafting a constitution for Greenland on the basis of a potential independence.

In 2017, Frederiksen was named Foreign Minister of Greenland after Vittus Qujaukitsoq resigned and became in charge of international relations between Greenland and Denmark. During her term as Foreign Minister, Frederiksen declared that a prior complaint by Qujaukitsoq to the United Nations was retracted and that the complaint was made by him alone.

Death
Frederiksen died on 21 July 2020, at the age of 55, following a long illness.

References

1965 births
Siumut politicians
2020 deaths
People from Kujalleq
Female foreign ministers
Women government ministers of Greenland
Agriculture ministers of Greenland
Foreign ministers of Greenland
Government ministers of Greenland
Women local politicians
Greenlandic city councillors
21st-century Greenlandic politicians
21st-century Danish women politicians